The 2019 UEFA European Under-21 Championship qualifying competition was a men's under-21 football competition that determined the 11 teams joining the automatically qualified hosts Italy in the 2019 UEFA European Under-21 Championship final tournament (the other co-hosts San Marino would not qualify automatically).

Apart from Italy, all remaining 54 UEFA member national teams entered the qualifying competition, with Gibraltar and Kosovo making their debuts. Players born on or after 1 January 1996 are eligible to participate.

Format
The qualifying competition consists of two rounds:
Qualifying group stage: The 54 teams are drawn into nine groups of six teams. Each group is played in home-and-away round-robin format. The nine group winners qualify directly for the final tournament, while the four best runners-up (not counting results against the sixth-placed team) advance to the play-offs.
Play-offs: The four teams are drawn into two ties to play home-and-away two-legged matches to determine the last two qualified teams.

Tiebreakers
In the qualifying group stage, teams are ranked according to points (3 points for a win, 1 point for a draw, 0 points for a loss), and if tied on points, the following tiebreaking criteria are applied, in the order given, to determine the rankings (Regulations Article 14.01):
Points in head-to-head matches among tied teams;
Goal difference in head-to-head matches among tied teams;
Goals scored in head-to-head matches among tied teams;
Away goals scored in head-to-head matches among tied teams;
If more than two teams are tied, and after applying all head-to-head criteria above, a subset of teams are still tied, all head-to-head criteria above are reapplied exclusively to this subset of teams;
Goal difference in all group matches;
Goals scored in all group matches;
Away goals scored in all group matches;
Disciplinary points (red card = 3 points, yellow card = 1 point, expulsion for two yellow cards in one match = 3 points);
UEFA coefficient for the qualifying group stage draw.

To determine the four best runners-up from the qualifying group stage, the results against the teams in sixth place are discarded. The following criteria are applied (Regulations Article 14.02):
Points;
Goal difference;
Goals scored;
Away goals scored;
Disciplinary points;
UEFA coefficient for the qualifying group stage draw.

In the play-offs, the team that scores more goals on aggregate over the two legs qualifies for the final tournament. If the aggregate score is level, the away goals rule is applied, i.e., the team that scores more goals away from home over the two legs advances. If away goals are also equal, extra time is played. The away goals rule is again applied after extra time, i.e., if there are goals scored during extra time and the aggregate score is still level, the visiting team advances by virtue of more away goals scored. If no goals are scored during extra time, the tie is decided by penalty shoot-out (Regulations Article 19.01).

Schedule
The qualifying matches are played on dates that fall within the FIFA International Match Calendar.

Qualifying group stage

Draw
The draw for the qualifying group stage was held on 26 January 2017, 09:00 CET (UTC+1), at the UEFA headquarters in Nyon, Switzerland.

The teams were seeded according to their coefficient ranking, calculated based on the following:
2013 UEFA European Under-21 Championship final tournament and qualifying competition (20%)
2015 UEFA European Under-21 Championship final tournament and qualifying competition (40%)
2017 UEFA European Under-21 Championship qualifying competition (40%)

Each group contained one team from each of Pots A–F. For political reasons, Spain and Gibraltar, Serbia and Kosovo, and Bosnia and Herzegovina and Kosovo would not be drawn in the same group.

Notes
Teams marked in bold qualified for the final tournament.

Groups

Group 1

Group 2

Group 3

Group 4

Group 5

Group 6

Group 7

Group 8

Group 9

Ranking of second-placed teams
To determine the four best second-placed teams from the qualifying group stage which advance to the play-offs, only the results of the second-placed teams against the first, third, fourth and fifth-placed teams in their group are taken into account, while results against the sixth-placed team are not included. As a result, eight matches played by each second-placed team will count for the purposes of determining the ranking.

Play-offs

Draw

Matches

Qualified teams
The following 12 teams qualify for the final tournament.

1 Bold indicates champions for that year. Italic indicates hosts for that year.
2 As West Germany
3 As Yugoslavia
4 As Serbia and Montenegro

Top goalscorers
11 goals

 Dawid Kownacki

8 goals

 Robert Skov
 Borja Mayoral

7 goals

 Landry Dimata
 Josip Brekalo
 Martin Terrier
 Cedric Teuchert
 Diogo Gonçalves
 George Puşcaş
 Georgi Melkadze
 Luka Jović
 Carlos Strandberg

For full lists of goalscorers, see sections in each group:

Group 1
Group 2
Group 3
Group 4
Group 5
Group 6
Group 7
Group 8
Group 9
Play-offs

References

External links

 
Qualification
2019
2017 in youth association football
2018 in youth association football
Under-21 Championship qualification
Under-21 Championship qualification
Under-21 Championship qualification
March 2017 sports events in Europe
June 2017 sports events in Europe
August 2017 sports events in Europe
September 2017 sports events in Europe
October 2017 sports events in Europe
November 2017 sports events in Europe
March 2018 sports events in Europe
June 2018 sports events in Europe
September 2018 sports events in Europe
October 2018 sports events in Europe
November 2018 sports events in Europe